"What My Heart Wants to Say" is the fourth single from English pop singer Gareth Gates' debut studio album of the same name. The song was written by Steve Mac and Jorgen Elofsson and produced by Mac. Upon its release on 9 December 2002, the single peaked at number five on the UK Singles Chart; it was Gates' first single not to reach the top spot in the UK.

Track listings
UK CD1
 "What My Heart Wants to Say" (single remix)
 "Christmas to Remember"
 "Good Thing"
 "What My Heart Wants to Say" (video)

UK CD2
 "What My Heart Wants to Say" (single remix)
 "Anyone of Us (Stupid Mistake)" (live)
 "Yesterday"
 "What My Heart Wants to Say" (exclusive behind the scenes footage)

European CD single
 "What My Heart Wants to Say" (single remix) – 4:12
 "Good Thing" – 3:48

Credits and personnel
Credits are lifted from the What My Heart Wants to Say album booklet.

Studios
 Produced, arranged, mixed, and engineered at Rokstone Studios (London, England)
 Strings recorded at Abbey Road Studios (London, England)
 Mastered at Transfermation (London, England)

Personnel
 Steve Mac – writing, keyboards, production, arrangement, mixing
 Jorgen Elofsson – writing
 Mae McKenna – additional backing vocals
 Chris Laws – drums, engineering
 Daniel Pursey – percussion, assistant engineering
 Richard Dowling – mastering

Charts

Weekly charts

Year-end charts

References

19 Recordings singles
2002 singles
2002 songs
Bertelsmann Music Group singles
Gareth Gates songs
RCA Records singles
Song recordings produced by Steve Mac
Songs written by Jörgen Elofsson
Songs written by Steve Mac
Syco Music singles